Carole Toïgo (born 4 August 1971)  is a French ski mountaineer.

Selected results 
 2002:
 1st, Tour du Rutor (together with Corinne Favre)
 2nd, World Championship team race (together with Corinne Favre)
 3rd, French Championship single
 6th, World Championship combination ranking
 7th, World Championship single race
 2003:
 10th, European Championship single race
 2004:
 3rd, World Championship team race (together with Corinne Favre)
 2006:
 2nd, World Championship team race (together with Corinne Favre)
 3rd, World Championship relay race (together with Véronique Lathuraz, Corinne Favre and Nathalie Bourillon)

Pierra Menta 

 2000: 4th, together with Laurence Darragon
 2001: 2nd, together with Corinne Favre
 2003: 3rd, together with Corinne Favre
 2004: 2nd, together with Corinne Favre
 2005: 3rd, together with Corinne Favre
 2006: 4th, together with Corinne Favre

References

External links 
 Carole Toïgo at SkiMountaineering.org

1971 births
Living people
French female ski mountaineers
21st-century French women